Acacia acrionastes is a shrub belonging to the genus Acacia and the subgenus Phyllodineae that is native to parts of eastern Australia.

It blooms between July and August and produces inflorescences with creamy yellow flowers.

The species was first formally described by the botanist Leslie Pedley in 1990 in the article Acacia acrionastes (Leguminosae: Mimosoideae), a new species from south-eastern Queensland as published in the journal Austrobaileya. The only synonym is Racosperma acrionastes. It is also often confused with Acacia adunca to which it is closely related.

It is found in north western New South Wales where it is considered rare and Queensland where it is more common. It is often a part of dry sclerophyll forest communities and grows in loamy clay soils over volcanic substrate.

See also
List of Acacia species

References

acrionastes
Flora of New South Wales
Flora of Queensland
Plants described in 1990
Taxa named by Leslie Pedley